Gegham Gharibjanian (born 02 October 1951) is an Armenian politician and diplomat.He was Ambassador Extraordinary and Plenipotentiary of Armenia,  State of Qatar, United Arab Emirates and Iran, Secretary General (Head of Staff) of the National Assembly of Armenia and Deputy Minister of the Ministry of Foreign Affairs of Armenia.

Biography
Gegham Gharibjanian was born in Yerevan, Soviet Union (now Armenia) on 2 October 1951. He married in 1981. Spouse, Aida Avagian was born in Yerevan, Soviet Union (now Armenia) on 14 January 1958.

Early life

He was born on October 2, 1951, in Yerevan

Education
 1973 – Faculty of Oriental Studies, Yerevan State University
 1994 – Higher Courses of Public Administration, University of South California (USC)

Professional Experience
 Oct 1973 - Jan 1978 – Senior Adviser, Committee for Cultural Relations with Armenian Diaspora

 Jan 1978 - Jan 1981 – Interpreter of Persian language in Iran
 Jan 1981 - May 1991 – Senior Adviser, Head of Department, Committee for Cultural Relations with Armenian Diaspora
 May 1991- Jun 1995 – Deputy Minister of Labour and Social Security of Armenia.
 Jul 1995- Feb 1999 – Member of the National Assembly of Armenia.
      - Vice-Chairman, Chairman of the Standing Committee on Social Affairs, Health and Environment of the National Assembly
      - Chairman of the Armenia – Iran Parliamentary Friendship Group
      - Vice-Chairman of the Interparlamentary Committee of the National Assembly of Armenia and the Federal Assembly of the Russian Federation
      - Vice-Chairman of the Social Committee to the CIS Interparliamentary Assembly
      - Founder of the "Social State" Parliamentary Group
 14 Jan 1999 - by the decree of the President of Armenia was granted the diplomatic rank of Ambassador Extraordinary and Plenipotentiary
 Jan 1999 - Jan 2005 – Ambassador Extraordinary and Plenipotentiary of Armenia to the Islamic Republic of Iran
 Aug 2001 - Jan 2005 – Ambassador Extraordinary and Plenipotentiary of Armenia to the State of Qatar (with residence in Tehran)
 Jan 2005 - Jan 2009 – Deputy Minister of Foreign Affairs of Armenia
 Jan 2009 - Feb 2012 – Secretary General (Head of Staff) of the National Assembly of Armenia
 May 2012- Sep 2018 – Ambassador Extraordinary and Plenipotentiary of Armenia to the United Arab Emirates
 May 2013 – Ambassador Extraordinary and Plenipotentiary of Armenia to the State of Qatar (with residence in Abu Dhabi)
 May 2019 - Oct 2021 – Ambassador Extraordinary and Plenipotentiary of Armenia to the State of Qatar (with residence in Doha)

Participation in Intergovernmental Commissions
 From 2004 to 2009  chaired the Armenian delegation at the Armenian-Chinese, Armenian-Indian and Armenian-Lebanese Intergovernmental Commissions’ meetings; was a member of the Armenian delegation at the Armenian-Russian and Armenian-Georgian Intergovernmental Commissions’ meetings

Other Information
 1998 – Full Member of the International Academy of Nature and Society
 1998 – Honorary Doctor of Law of the Institute for Foreign Economic Relations and Management

Awards

 2021     – "Al Wajbah" Medal of the State of Qatar for enhancing     relations between Qatar & Armenia
 2017     – "St. Nerses the Graceful" Medal of the Armenian Apostolic Holy     Church for his service to the Homeland and the Armenian people in great     appreciation of his accomplishments by Karekin II, Supreme Patriarch and     Catholicos of All Armenians
 2011     – Gold medal by "Vahan Tekeyan" Foundation
 2011     – "Mkhitar Gosh" medal by the decree of the President of Armenia
 2009     –  Letter of Gratitude from the Minister of Foreign Affairs of Armenia for his invaluable contribution to the activity of the Ministry of Foreign Affairs and advancement of the Armenian Diplomacy
 2009     –  Letter of Gratitude from the International Organizing Committee for  organizing "4th Pan Armenian Games"
 2009     – "Drastamat Kanayan" Medal by the Minister of Defense of Armenia
 2007     – Second class order of "Saint Vladimir" of the Russian National     Committee of the Public Awards
 2007     – Medal "For strengthening cooperation" from the Police of     Armenia"
 2007     – Anniversary medal "15 years of CSTO"
 2007     – "Fridtjof Nansen" Gold Medal
 2006     – Medal "For the Defense of the Caucasus" from the North Caucasus Military District
 2006     – Diploma of the National Academy of Sciences of Armenia for his contribution to Armenian-Iranian scientific and cultural relations

Diplomatic Rank
Ambassador Extraordinary and Plenipotentiary

Languages
Russian, Persian and English languages

Family Status
Married with three children and three grandchildren

References

Talk with Ambassador Gegham Gharibjanian

Minister of State for Foreign Affairs Receives Copy of Credentials of Ambassador of Armenia

H.H. The Amir Receives Credentials of Ambassador of Armenia

1951 births
Living people
Ambassadors of Armenia to the United Arab Emirates
Ambassadors of Armenia to Qatar
Ambassadors of Armenia to Iran
Armenian politicians